Kathy Stanton is a former Member of the Northern Ireland Assembly, on which she represented Belfast North for Sinn Féin.
Stanton was co-opted to Belfast City Council in 2000, before losing her seat in the 2001 local government elections. She was then elected to the Assembly in the 2003 election. In 2006 she announced that she would not be contesting the next Assembly election, but denied reports that this was owing to Sinn Féin endorsing the Police Service of Northern Ireland. 

She is a full-time party official in north Belfast, and is her party's spokesperson on Equality. She lives in the New Lodge area with her five children.

Year of birth missing (living people)
Living people
Sinn Féin MLAs
Members of Belfast City Council
Northern Ireland MLAs 2003–2007
Female members of the Northern Ireland Assembly
Sinn Féin councillors in Northern Ireland
Women councillors in Northern Ireland